The yellow-winged pytilia (Pytilia hypogrammica), also known as the red-faced pytilia, is an African estrildid finch.

Distribution
The finch has an estimated global extent of occurrence of 250,000 km2. It is commonly found in Benin, Burkina Faso, Cameroon, Central African Republic, Chad, The Democratic Republic of the Congo, Côte d'Ivoire, Ghana, Guinea, Liberia, Nigeria, Sierra Leone and Togo.

Origin
Origin and phylogeny has been obtained by Antonio Arnaiz-Villena et al. Estrildinae may have originated in India and dispersed thereafter (towards Africa and Pacific Ocean habitats).

References

External links
BirdLife International species factsheet

yellow-winged pytilia
Birds of West Africa
yellow-winged pytilia